Out to an Other Side is the third solo album by master uilleann piper and prominent Irish traditional musician Liam O'Flynn. Produced by Shaun Davey and recorded at Windmill Lane Studios in Dublin, Ireland, the album was released on the Tara Music label in 1993. As with a number of Liam's other album titles, Out to an Other Side comes from the writing of Nobel Laureate Seamus Heaney with whom Liam has performed live on numerous occasions.

Critical response

The Allmusic web site gave the album four and a half out of five stars, calling it O'Flynn's "most eclectic album" featuring "solo tracks as well as folk revival and orchestral arrangements".

Track listing
All songs are Traditional, except where noted.
 "The Foxchase" – 9:5
 "The Wild Geese" – 5:51
 "The Dean's Pamphlet" – 3:55 
 "Gynt at the Gate" (Shaun Davey) – 4:33
 "The Winter's End" (Shaun Davey) – 3:22
 "After Aughrim's Great Disaster" – 3:21
 "Blackwells" (Shaun Davey) – 4:08
 "Ar Bhruach na Laoi" – 6:11
 "Lady Dillon" – 4:13
 "Dollards and the Harlequin Hornpipes" – 3:10
 "Sean O Duibhir a Ghleanna – 3:59

Personnel
 Liam O'Flynn – uilleann piper (in D, C#, and C), whistle
 Bill Dowdall – flute, piccolo
 Matthew Manning – oboe, Cor anglais
 Carl Geraghty – saxophone
 Fergus O'Carroll – French horn
 Graham Hastings – trumpet, flugelhorn
 Noel Eccles – percussion
 Arty McGlynn – guitar
 Des Moore – guitar
 Helen Davies – Irish harp
 Sean Keane – violin
 Nollaig Casey – violin, viola
 Adele O'Dwyer – cello
 Joe Czibi jnr. – double bass
 Rod McVey – synthesizer
 Peter Connolly – electric bass
 Steve Cooney – electric bass
 Paul McAteer – drums
 The Voice Squad – vocals
 Rita Connolly – vocals
 Liam Ó Maonlaí – vocals

References

External links
 Record Label Catalogue 2009
 Album Sleevenotes

1993 albums
Liam O'Flynn albums